Ekaterine Gorgodze and Maryna Zanevska were the defending champions but chose not to participate.

Paula Kania and Katarzyna Piter won the title, defeating Magdalena Fręch and Viktorija Golubic in the final, 6–2, 6–4.

Seeds

Draw

Draw

References

External Links
Main Draw

L'Open 35 de Saint-Malo - Doubles
2020 Doubles